The Hill Tracts Presbyterian Kawhmi is a Christian denomination in Bangladesh. It comes from a work started in 1918 by the Welsh missionary Rev. Edwin Rowland. The North East India Mission was responsible for the work. The first conversions took place in 1926, and the first church building was opened in 1929. In 1968 the Evangelical Christian Church become self-supporting. Several splits occurred, the Hill Tracts Presbyterian Church was formed in 1980. It has no official affiliation with any other denominations abroad. It had 2,236 members in 26 congregation.

References 

Presbyterian denominations in Asia
Christian organizations established in 1980
Protestantism in Bangladesh